The following are lists of University of the Philippines people by categories:
List of University of the Philippines College of Law alumni
List of University of the Philippines Diliman people
List of University of the Philippines Los Baños people
List of University of the Philippines Upsilonians

University of the Philippines